Ismael Shah (May 22, 1962 - October 29, 1992) was a Pakistani film actor known for his movies like, "Baghi Qaidi"(1986), and "Nachay Naagin"(1989).

Early life and family
Ismael Shah was born in Pishin District, Baluchistan in 1962. He belonged to a Syed family that had migrated first from Kashmir to Afghanistan and then to Baluchistan.

Acting career
Ismael Shah started his acting career in Baluchi dramas from PTV Quetta center in 1975. His first Urdu TV play was, "Regbaan". In 1980, he performed a historical character in PTV drama serial Shaheen and became famous for it. His cinema debut was "Baghi Qaidi" which was released in 1986. It was an action thriller that went well on the box office. This movie opened the doors of Lollywood for him. Due to his dance performances in later movies like,"Dulari"(1987) and "Nachay Nagin"(1987), Ismael Shah was tagged as the "first dancing hero of Pakistan".

Personal life
Ismael Shah died at a young age of 30.

Death
Ismael Shah died on October 29, 1992 due to a sudden heart attack.

Filmography

Television series

Film
Ismael Shah worked in total 75 Urdu & Punjabi movies. His hit films are:
	1986: Baghi Qaidi (Urdu)
 	1987: Dulari (Punjabi)
   1987: Nachay Nagin (Punjabi)
   1987: Ek Say Barh Kar Ek (Urdu)
 	1987: Iqrar (Urdu)
 	1987: Love in Nepal (Urdu)
 	1988: Mukhra (Punjabi
 	1988: Basheera in Trouble (Punjabi)
 	1988: Bardasht (Punjabi)
 	1988: Baghi Haseena (Urdu)
 	1988: Maa Bani Dulhan (Urdu)
 	1988: Shehanshah (Punjabi/Urdu double version)
   1988: Tohfa (Punjabi)
 	1989: Josheela Dushman (Urdu)
 	1989: Manila Kay Janbaz (Urdu)
 	1990: Hifazat (Punjabi)
 	1991: Kalay Chor (Punjabi/Urdu double version)

References

External Links
 

1962 births
20th-century Pakistani male actors
Pakistani male television actors
1992 deaths
People from Pishin District
Male actors in Pashto cinema
Pakistani film actors
Male actors in Punjabi cinema
Pakistani male film actors
Male actors in Urdu cinema